Blekendorf is a municipality in the district of Plön, in Schleswig-Holstein, Germany. It has a population of 1,694 people (2020).

References

Municipalities in Schleswig-Holstein
Plön (district)